Has Anyone Here Seen Sigfried? is the fourth studio album by American progressive rock/AOR band Pavlov's Dog, released in 2007.

The album was meant to be the band's third studio release, succeeding At the Sound of the Bell. However, according to lead singer David Surkamp, "the band was falling apart" at the time, the recording sessions were troubled, and Columbia Records "refused to release" the album. The band broke up in 1977, and the recordings were supposed to remain unreleased. Yet, the band's guitarist Steve Scorfina had a tape of the mix from which he created 100 unofficial vinyl copies and released them in 1977 as The St. Louis Hounds. During the next 30 years the album was reissued several times with various titles (most commonly as Third), always as a bootleg.

With the original master tapes lost, Rockville Music enhanced the sound of the bootlegged releases the best they could, added 10 bonus tracks and released the album legally for the first time in 2007. The front cover depicts the band's original violinist Sigfried Carver, who left them shortly after Pampered Menials release and is the person in question on the album's title.

In 2013 the long-lost master tapes were rediscovered along with the original artwork. Then in 2014 the album was properly remastered and reissued with different bonus tracks and what was intended to be the original album cover, a drawing of Sherlock Holmes and Dr. Watson.

Track listing
All tracks credited to David Surkamp, except where noted. All information according to the album's liner notes.

2007 first official release

2014 remastered and alternated reissue

PersonnelMain albumDavid Surkamp: lead vocals
Doug Rayburn: keyboards
Steve Scorfina: lead guitar, rhythm guitar, lead vocals on It's All For You
Rick Stockton: bass guitar
Thomas Nickeson: keyboards, guitar, backing vocals
Kirk Sarkisian: drums2007 bonus tracksDavid Surkamp: lead vocals
Doug Rayburn: mellotron, guitar
Steve Scorfina: lead guitar on tracks 11-19
Rick Stockton: bass guitar on tracks 11-19
Mike Safron: drums on tracks 11-15 and 19
Kirk Sarkisian: drums on tracks 16-18
David Hamilton: keyboards on tracks 11-15 and 19
Thomas Nickeson: keyboards on tracks 16-18
Siegfried Carver: violin on tracks 11-15 and 192014 bonus tracks'

References

2007 albums
Pavlov's Dog (band) albums